The women's épée fencing competition at the 2015 Summer Universiade in Gwangju was held on 4 July at the Kim Dae-Jung Convention Center.

Results

Preliminaries

Pool 1

Pool 2

Pool 3

Pool 4

Pool 5

Pool 6

Pool 7

Pool 8

Pool 9

Pool 10

2015 Summer Universiade events